The 2019 DTM Brands Hatch round was a motor racing event for the Deutsche Tourenwagen Masters held between 9 and 11 August 2019. The event, part of the 33rd season of the DTM, was held at Brands Hatch in the United Kingdom.

Results

Race 1

Qualifying

 – Car #21 suffered terminal damage during qualifying and was withdrawn from the opening race

Race

Race 2

Qualifying

Race

Championship standings

Drivers Championship

Teams Championship

Manufacturers Championship

 Note: Only the top five positions are included for three sets of standings.

See also
 2019 W Series Brands Hatch round

References

External links
Official website

|- style="text-align:center"
|width="35%"|Previous race:
|width="30%"|Deutsche Tourenwagen Masters2019 season
|width="40%"|Next race:

Brands Hatch DTM
DTM Brands Hatch